Andrei Cadar (born 6 February 1937), also known as András Kádár, is a Romanian equestrian. He competed in two events at the 1960 Summer Olympics.

References

External links
 
 

1937 births
Living people
Romanian male equestrians
Olympic equestrians of Romania
Equestrians at the 1960 Summer Olympics
People from Târgu Secuiesc